The KSR2 gene (also called "The fat gene") is
Kinase suppressor of ras 2 it is a protein that in humans is encoded by the KSR2 gene. KSR2 mutation effects in humans by obesity and because KSR2 gene reduces the ERK signaling and it reduces glucose and fatty acid oxidation.
KSR2 mutation reduces the glucose and fatty acid oxidation process but it makes growth factor "Epidermal growth factor (EGF)" reaction more faster to simulate cell growth and KSR2 cause insulin resistance, KSA2 gene also regulates how the body uses the energy, and it usually causes type 2 diabetes.

References 

Genes
Human proteins
EC 2.7.11